The white-fronted ground tyrant (Muscisaxicola albifrons) is a species of bird in the tyrant flycatcher family Tyrannidae.
It is found in Bolivia, Chile, and Peru.
Its natural habitats are subtropical or tropical high-altitude grassland and swamps.

References

Further reading

Muscisaxicola
Birds described in 1844
Taxonomy articles created by Polbot